Azat Turlybekuly Peruashev (Azat Tūrlybekūly Peruaşev; born 8 September 1967) is a Kazakh politician who's serving as the member of the Mazhilis from 2012. He is currently the chairman of the Aq Jol Democratic Party since 2011. From 1998 to 2006, Peruashev was the First Secretary of the Civic Party until its merger with Otan in 2006.

Biography

Early life and education 
Peruashev was born to a Muslim family in the village of Rgaity. From 1986 to 1988, he served in the Soviet Army. In 1991, Peruashev graduated from the Ural State University, specializing in political science. In 1996, he completed the Academy of Public Administration under the President of the Republic of Kazakhstan with a degree in Public Administration Manager. In 2000, Peruashev graduated from the Zhetysu Economic Institute with a degree in economics-manager.

Early career 
In 1991, he became an instructor at the Panfilov District Committee of the Communist Party of Kazakhstan. From 1992, Peruashev served as a consultant and the head of the sector of the Taldykorgan Regional Administration. In 1996, he became a consultant and the head of the sector of the Presidential Administration of Kazakhstan. From 1998, Peruashev was the Deputy General Director of JSC Aluminum of Kazakhstan.

From 1998 to 2006, Peruashev served as the First Secretary of the Central Committee of the Civic Party of Kazakhstan. Between 2006 and 2011, he served as the chairman of the National Economic Chamber of Kazakhstan (The Atameken Union).

Political career 
Since 2011, Peruashev has been the chairman of the Ak Zhol Democratic Party. He became a member of the Mazhilis in the 2012 Kazakh legislative election.

State honours
Order of Friendship (2001)
'Barys' Award, 3rd degree (2008)

References

External links
Ak Zhol official party website
Background on Azat Peruashev - Carnegie Endowment for International Peace
Company Overview of National Economic Chamber Atameken Union - Bloomberg

1967 births
Living people
Kazakhstani politicians
Ural State University alumni